Broad Ripple Village is one of seven areas designated as cultural districts in Indianapolis, Indiana.

 the title of a poem titled "Broad Ripple" by Hoosier Poet James Whitcomb Riley. The neighborhood has a reputation for being socially, economically, and ethnically diverse.

History

The public school system dates back to at least 1843, when Washington Township School Number Five was built. Washington Township School Number Fourteen was built in 1854. A newer, four-room brick school, "built to accommodate the advanced pupils of the entire township", opened in 1884. Broad Ripple High School originated as a two-year program in 1886, becoming a three-year program in 1887 and a four-year program sometime between 1893 and 1895. The grade school and high school shared buildings, including the newer 1914 building, until 1926. Broad Ripple High School became the fourth high school in Indianapolis Public Schools in autumn 1923 after Broad Ripple was annexed to Indianapolis. The high school closed at the end of the 2017–2018 school year.

Broad Ripple was annexed to the city of Indianapolis in June 1922, after previous failed attempts in 1906, 1909, and 1913, and several other times.

Culture
Broad Ripple Park is a  park bordering the White River and located just to the northeast of the village. It features an outdoor swimming pool, tennis courts, baseball diamond, athletic fields, playground, picnic shelters, dog park, wooded preserve, fitness path, and a boat ramp.

In 1987, Lillian R. Barcio founded and served as the editor in chief of Broad Ripple's first dedicated monthly newspaper, The Village Sampler. The first issue was published in June 1987. The paper ceased publication in December 1998. In 2004 a free biweekly newspaper, The Broad Ripple Gazette, was created by Broad Ripple native Alan Hague.

Transportation

Indiana Pacers Bikeshare launched in the neighborhood on September 5, 2019, with two of the system's 50 docking stations located in Broad Ripple.

See also
Indianapolis Art Center
List of Indianapolis neighborhoods

References

External links

 Broad Ripple Village Association
 Broad Ripple History

Culture of Indianapolis
Neighborhoods in Indianapolis
Populated places established in 1837
1837 establishments in Indiana
Former municipalities in Indiana